NIOSH Education and Research Centers are multidisciplinary centers supported by the National Institute for Occupational Safety and Health for education and research in the field of occupational health. Through the centers, NIOSH supports academic degree programs, research, continuing education, and outreach. The ERCs, distributed in regions across the United States, establish academic, labor, and industry research partnerships. The research conducted at the centers is related to the National Occupational Research Agenda (NORA) established by NIOSH.

Founded in 1977, NIOSH ERCs are responsible for nearly half of post-baccalaureate graduates entering occupational health and safety fields. The ERCs focus on core academic disciplines of industrial hygiene, occupational health nursing, occupational medicine, occupational safety, and other areas of specialization listed below by center. At many ERCs, students in specific disciplines have their tuition paid in full and receive additional stipend money.  ERCs provide a benefit to local businesses by offering reduced price assessments and training.

Education and research centers

Source: Centers for Disease Control and Prevention

University of Alabama at Birmingham - Deep South Center for Occupational Safety & Health: Industrial Hygiene, Occupational Injury Prevention Research Training, Occupational Health Nursing, Occupational Safety & Ergonomics
University of Cincinnati: University of Cincinnati ERC. Biological Monitoring, Industrial Hygiene, Occupational Health Nursing, Occupational Medicine
University of Colorado Denver: Mountain & Plains ERC. Ergonomics, Health Physics, Industrial Hygiene, Occupational/Environmental Medicine, Occupational Health Psychology
Harvard University: Harvard ERC. Industrial Hygiene, Occupational Epidemiology, Occupational Injury Prevention and Control, Occupational Medicine
University of Illinois at Chicago: Great Lakes Center for Occupational Health and Safety. Agricultural Safety and Health, Hazardous Substances Training, Industrial Hygiene, Occupational and Environmental Epidemiology, Occupational Medicine, Occupational Safety
University of Iowa: Heartland Center for Occupational Health and Safety. Agricultural Safety and Health, Ergonomics, Industrial Hygiene, Occupational Epidemiology, Occupational Health Nursing, Occupational Injury Prevention, Occupational Medicine
Johns Hopkins University: Johns Hopkins ERC. Biomarkers of Occupational Exposure/Susceptibility, Industrial Hygiene, Occupational Epidemiology, Occupational Health Nursing, Occupational Medicine
University of Kentucky: Central Appalachian Regional ERC. Occupational Safety, Occupational Medicine, Occupational Epidemiology, Occupational Athletic Training, Occupational and Environmental Health Nursing, Mining Health & Safety, Industrial Hygiene, Agricultural Safety & Health.
University of Michigan: University of Michigan Center for Occupational Health and Safety Engineering. Industrial Hygiene, Occupational Epidemiology, Occupational Health Nursing, Occupational Safety Engineering and Ergonomics
University of Minnesota: Midwest Center for Occupational Health and Safety. Industrial Hygiene, Occupational Epidemiology, Occupational Health Nursing, Occupational Health Services Research and Policy, Occupational Injury Prevention Research Training, Occupational Medicine
University of North Carolina Chapel Hill: North Carolina Occupational Safety and Health ERC. Occupational Epidemiology, Occupational Exposure Science, Occupational Health Nursing, Occupational Medicine, Occupational Safety and Ergonomics
Icahn School of Medicine at Mount Sinai New York and New Jersey Education and Research Center: Industrial Hygiene, Occupational Ergonomics, Occupational Medicine, Occupational Safety and Health
University of South Florida: Sunshine ERC. Occupational Exposure Science, Health Safety & Environment, Occupational Health Nursing, Occupational Health Psychology, Occupational Safety Management, Occupational Medicine
University of Texas: Southwest Center for Occupational and Environmental Health Industrial Hygiene, Occupational Epidemiology, Occupation Injury Prevention, Occupational Medicine
University of California Berkeley: Northern California ERC. Ergonomics, Industrial Hygiene, Occupational Epidemiology, Occupational Health Nursing, Occupational Medicine
University of California Los Angeles: Southern California ERC. Industrial Hygiene, Occupational Health Nursing, Occupational Medicine
University of Utah - The Rocky Mountain Center for Occupational and Environmental Health: Ergonomics and Safety, Hazardous Substances Academic Training, Industrial Hygiene, Occupational Injury Prevention and Research, Occupational Medicine
University of Washington: Northwest Center for Occupational Health and Safety. Industrial Hygiene, Occupational Health Nursing, Occupational Health Services Research Training, Occupational Medicine

References

National Institute for Occupational Safety and Health
Health education in the United States